The 2017-18 season was the first season in Lee Man Football Club's existence, and their first year in Hong Kong Premier League, top flight football in Hong Kong, and also the FA Cup.

Players

Loans

Loans in

Loans out

Club officials

Club Coach Staff

Competitions

Hong Kong Premier League

Table

Results by round

League Matches

Hong Kong FA Cup

Hong Kong Senior Challenge Shield

Hong Kong Sapling Cup

References

Lee Man FC seasons
Hong Kong football clubs 2017–18 season